The Cambridge News (formerly the Cambridge Evening News) is a British daily newspaper. Published each weekday and on Saturdays, it is distributed from its Milton base. In the period December 2010 – June 2011 it had an average daily circulation of 20,987, but by December 2016 this had fallen to around 13,000. In 2018, the circulation of the newspaper fell to 8,005 and by December 2022 the preceding 6-month average was 3,024.

History

The paper was founded by William Farrow Taylor as the Cambridge Daily News in 1888, and after a slow start saw sales rise as an appetite for knowledge of the news and sport grew among the Cambridge public. As its following steadily grew, the fledgling paper survived the need for modernisation in the early twentieth century (Captain Archibald Taylor, son of the founder, was the first managing director to introduce a standard typeface during this time, for example), the uncertain economic climate during the 1920s and 1930s and the printing shortages of the Second World War.

In the 1920s the Taylors sold the paper to the Iliffe family, who sold it in 1938 and then reacquired it in 1959, moving it to a larger premises on Newmarket Road: they continued to turn the paper into a profit-making business under the new name of the Cambridge Evening News, starting in 1969.  The headquarters moved from Newmarket Road to Milton in 1997. In 2012, Local World acquired the title from Yattendon Group.

In 2007, the paper started publishing an early morning "Sunrise" edition titled simply Cambridge News, as well as the afternoon edition. The evening edition was stopped the following year, and Evening was removed from the paper's title.

The Cambridge News had eight sister papers with a more local circulation as part of the Weekly News series: Cambridge, Ely, Huntingdon, St Ives and St Neots (all in Cambridgeshire), Haverhill and Newmarket (in Suffolk), Royston (in Hertfordshire) and Saffron Walden (in Essex).

Until 2002 the St Neots edition was titled St Neots Evening News and the Huntingdon & St Ives edition Huntingdon and St Ives Evening News for around three years, before reverting to their original names. The paper is also active in local community campaigns such as its long running 'Action on the A14' campaign which demands action be taken on the dangerous road that bisects the paper's readership area, and also sponsors numerous local events such as the Village & Community Magazine Awards and the annual Business Excellence Awards, while running its own Community Awards to recognise readers who have made a difference in the area. The editor from February 2008 until April 2016 was Paul Brackley. David Bartlett was appointed editor in June 2016.

On Saturday 13 September 2014, the newspaper was relaunched with a new design, alongside daily paid-for regional editions Hunts News, Royston News and Walden News replacing the free weekly publications.

The 6 December 2017 edition of Cambridge News was noted for a printing error on the front page. The newspaper went to print with a main headline consisting of placeholder text which read "100PT SPLASH HEADING HERE" instead of the intended news story, followed by more filler text contained in a strapline. After images of the cover spread virally on social media, the editor-in-chief apologised to readers and blamed a technical error in the publishing process.

Awards
The paper won Regional Newspaper of the Year at The Newspaper Awards held in 2009 and 2013. This award was part sponsored by its own parent organisation.

Online media
Cambridge News publishes most of its news online via its website. The site can be viewed for free and without registration although the e-edition of the newspaper is behind a paywall.

References

External links
 Cambridge News Online
 Iliffe Print Cambridge

Mass media in Cambridge
Newspapers published in Cambridgeshire
Publications established in 1888
Daily newspapers published in the United Kingdom